Luís de Camões Garden is a public park in Santo António, Macau, located next to the Church of Santo António. It is the oldest park in the territory, covering  of space. 

Camões Grotto is the former home of 16th century Portuguese poet Luís de Camões and one time Macau resident.  Years later, the British East India Company bought the mansion and established its headquarters there.

The facility includes the Macao Public Library  Wong Ieng Kuan Library in Luís de Camões Garden (Biblioteca de Wong Ieng Kuan no Jardim Luís de Camões Garden; 白鴿巢公園黃營均圖書館)

See also
 List of oldest buildings and structures in Macau

References

External links
 Luís de Camões Park – webpage by the Municipal Affairs Bureau

Buildings and structures in Macau
Portuguese colonial architecture in China